José Fábio da Silva or simply Fábio (born October 8, 1984, in Ribeirão-PE), is a Brazilian right back. He currently plays for Sociedade Esportiva do Gama.

Honours
 Flamengo
Copa do Brasil: 2006
:

Contract
Ituano (Loan) 1 June 2007 to 30 November 2007
Flamengo 10 February 2004 to 31 December 2007

External links
 sambafoot
 CBF
 ituanofc

1984 births
Living people
Brazilian footballers
Ituano FC players
CR Flamengo footballers
Guaratinguetá Futebol players
Sociedade Esportiva do Gama players
Association football defenders
People from Ribeirão Preto
Footballers from São Paulo (state)